Reishia is a genus of sea snails, marine gastropod mollusks in the family Muricidae, the murex snails or rock snails.

Species
Species within the genus Reishia include:
 Reishia bitubercularis (Lamarck, 1822)
Reishia clavigera (Küster, 1860)
 Reishia keluo (K.-S. Tan & L.-L. Liu, 2001)
 Reishia luteostoma (Holten, 1802)
 Reishia okutanii Thach, 2016
Reishia problematica (Baker, 1891)
Synonyms
Reishia armigera (Link, 1807): synonym of Mancinella armigera Link, 1807
Reishia bronni (Dunker, 1860): synonym of Reishia luteostoma (Holten, 1802) (junior subjective synonym)
Reishia capensis (Petit, 1852): synonym of Mancinella capensis (Petit de la Saussaye, 1852)
 Reishia jubilaea (K.-S. Tan & Sigurdsson, 1990): synonym of Reishia luteostoma (Holten, 1802) (unaccepted > junior subjective synonym)
 Reishia pseudodiadema (Yokoyama, 1928): synonym of Thais pseudodiadema (Yokoyama, 1928)

References

 Kuroda, T.; Habe, T.; Oyama, K. (1971). The sea shells of Sagami Bay. Maruzen Co., Tokyo. xix, 1-741 (Japanese text), 1-489 (English text), 1-51 (Index), pls 1–121.
 Claremont M., Vermeij G.J., Williams S.T. & Reid D.G. (2013) Global phylogeny and new classification of the Rapaninae (Gastropoda: Muricidae), dominant molluscan predators on tropical rocky seashores. Molecular Phylogenetics and Evolution 66: 91–102

 
Rapaninae